James Earl Smith (born  July 12, 1945) is a former American football defensive back. He played for the Denver Broncos in 1969.

References

1945 births
Living people
Denver Broncos players
American football defensive backs
Utah State Aggies football players